Adele Island is an island located in the Indian Ocean approximately  North of Ardyaloon off the Kimberley coast in Western Australia.

Description
It is low-lying and surrounded by extensive sandbanks lying over a limestone platform forming a large lagoon.

History
Nicolas Baudin named the island in 1801 as part of his expedition around Australia. The name of the island was first charted on the Freycinet Map of 1811. It was declared a Nature Reserve in 2001 in recognition of its status as a bird breeding sanctuary. Since then the Department of Environment and Conservation has embarked on a campaign to eradicate the island of the Polynesian Rats that are a constant threat to the native seabirds.

An acetylene-powered lighthouse was built on the island in 1951 it was later upgraded to solar power in 1985.

Birds
The island is classified by BirdLife International as an Important Bird Area for its seabirds and waders.  As well as breeding cormorants and Australian pelicans, globally important bird species breeding or staging on the island are lesser frigatebird with 2000-5700 breeding pairs, brown booby with 1500-8500 breeding pairs, grey-tailed tattler with up to 5500 individuals, and red-necked stint with up to 4100 individuals.

Rolloliths 
Rollolith is also found in Adele Island. It is the basic name given to benthic creatures. Rolloliths can be made of barnacles (balanuliths); coral (corallith); vermetulid worms (vermetuliths); red crustose coralline green growth (rhodolith); or bryozoans (bryoliths).

Notes

References

Islands of the Kimberley (Western Australia)
Protected areas of Western Australia
Important Bird Areas of Western Australia
Western Australian places listed on the defunct Register of the National Estate